Otročín is a municipality and village in Karlovy Vary District in the Karlovy Vary Region of the Czech Republic. It has about 400 inhabitants.

Administrative parts
Villages of Brť, Měchov, Poseč and Tisová are administrative parts of Otročín.

References

Villages in Karlovy Vary District